The MDR (an acronym for micro dynamic rifle)  is a family of autoloading bullpup rifles designed by Desert Tech (formerly Desert Tactical Arms) in 2014. A second generation version of the rifle is marketed as the  MDRX (an acronym for micro dynamic rifle eXtreme).  In 2018 a military version of the MDR, the NGSAR, was submitted, but was not one of the finalists in the United States Army Next Generation Squad Weapon Program trials to replace standard issue US army Infantry Weapons.

The MDR's first public debut was in 2014 at Shot Show.

Design
The Desert Tech MDR is a gas operated, conventional rotary bolt bullpup rifle. The gas system features a gas piston located above the barrel and a 6 position manual gas regulator.

The MDR rifle is designed to be ambidextrous. The MDR contains an ambidextrous forward and side eject port and viewing window that allows for tool free forward ejector side change.  A non reciprocating ambidextrous charging handle is installed on both sides of the gun, and two or three-position safety / selector levers and magazine release are provided on both sides of the pistol grip.  The rifle is compatible with Desert Tech caliber conversion kits that allow the rifle to change caliber.  This provides a unique feature in which the rifle chassis can accept both intermediate cartridges and full-powered rifle cartridges on the same serial number platform (such as 5.56×45mm NATO and 7.62×51mm NATO magazines).

The outer shell of the gun is made from impact-resistant polymer with an aluminium receiver.

Many of the MDR rifle components are produced using modern Metal injection molding (MIM) metalworking processes that are becoming more common in the firearm industry.  MDR MIM parts including the Barrel Block (Trunnion), Gas Block, Bolt Catch, 7.62 mag conversion bar, ejector retainer, and extractor link, are produced by Indo-MIM Pvt. Ltd., India.  Indo-MIM Pvt, Ltd received the 2017 distinction in hand/tools award by PIM international for their innovation in MIM development and part cost reduction. 

The .308/7.62 MDR was 10,000 round endurance tested with .308 win 150 grain FMJ American Eagle, 7.62x51 149 grain American Eagle, 7.62 m80 ball US Surplus and averaged 1 failure in 2000 rounds.

NGSAR Prototype, Modified MDR for NGSW

In 2018 a modified MDR family rifle, the NGSAR, chambered in a proprietary 6.8mm polymer-cased ammunition cartridge made by PCP was selected as one of the United States Army's Next Generation Squad Weapon Program (NGSW) weapons trial finalists to replace the United States Army's 5.56×45mm NATO caliber weapon systems.  Desert Tech partnered with PCP tactical who provided a custom ammunition solution.  The NGSAR was trialed in a carbine and automatic rifle configuration and were ultimately rejected.

The NGSAR rifle included improvements in the design such as a T-Worx battery powered integrated data rail, onboard round counter, longer receiver, bolt carrier, barrel extension, charging handle, forward eject system, barrel mounting system, proprietary 6.8mm PCP magazines, custom flow reflex suppressor, CNOD day/night optic.

MDR .308/7.62 upgrade program
The 2017 MDR in .308/7.62 win received public feedback that resulted in an upgrade program by Desert Tech on the gas and extractor system in 2019 to improve the rifle's ammunition tolerance without having to adjust the gas setting as frequently. This update is considered the Generation 2 MDR Gas System.

Desert Tech publicly addressed the MDR criticism on January 10, 2019. Desert Tech directly attributed the most vocal criticism of the platform to the InRangeTV company in collaboration with the Forgotten Weapons Company that demonstrated numerous failures in the system that were identified to be from varying ammunition loads used in the gas system on December 13, 2018. In addition to addressing the criticism, Desert Tech provided a technical root cause analysis presentation on the platform failures and resulting improvements with the generation 2 gas system. As a supplemental incentive, Desert Tech announced their MDR generation 2 gas system upgrade was to be covered under their warranty program for all owners.

MDRX redesign
The Micro Dynamic Rifle eXtreme, MDRX, variant was produced and marketed as a separate firearm in 2020. Improvements to the firearm include the following:  Improved impact-resistant polymer, improved trigger, improved gas block, and a new "Ratchet" compensator.

The firearm was offered in .300 BLK, 6.5 Creedmoor (The first production semi-auto bullpup chambered in this cartridge), along with its original .223/5.56 and .308/7.62 calibers as well as 20" barrel and side ejection options. This update is considered the generation 3 MDR gas system.

Desert Tech halted production of the .300 BLK Rifle and conversion kits in late 2020 up until January of 2023.

A California compliant variant was produced with a 20" barrel, shark fin grip, reduced magazine size, and California compliant Ratchet compensator to qualify for a featureless rifle restrictions.

The MDRX, with its various caliber kits, is rated from the manufacturer between 1-2 MOA.  A large multi shooter community study in 2022, including aftermarket precision vendors such as ES Tactical, was able to quantify the performance of the stock OEM barrel between 1.9 and 5.6 MOA with 5 shot groups in .308 with various ammunition as well as identified a contributing failure mode of Trunnion fasteners loosening over time.

MDR/MDRX official variant updates/upgrades

On April 4th, 2019, Desert Tech announced multiple MDR updates to improve rifle performance on the 308 Rifle.  The manufacturer indicated that these updates would be incorporated in all post-announcement shipments.  These updates including the 2019 6-hole gas valve and wider extractor. In addition a heavy hammer spring is available for special order to resolve light strike failures on hardened primers.

On August 13th, 2019, Desert Tech announced a forward eject panel spring buffer kit for sale to resolve forward eject panel spring weakening over time on the MDR platform. 

On January 9th, 2020, Desert Tech announced the MDRx Rifle was available for sale.

On January 28th, 2021, the MDRX Micron conversion kit was announced that allowed the purchase of a 11.5" 5.56/.223 Wylde barrel, replacement hand guard, ejector plates, a new 'Raiden' flash hider, and bolt replacement for a side eject bullpup with a total length of 23.43".  These kits allow standard MDRX and MDR rifles to be classified and regulated as a short-barreled rifle (SBR) requiring the user to apply with the appropriate regulatory bodies before install of the conversion kit in their rifle. These kits became available for sale on January 29, 2021.

On March 18, 2021, a collaboration between Desert Tech and BLK LBL Bipods was announced to develop, produce, and sell the Mantis handguard. The aluminium handguard with integrated bipod is designed for both 16" and 20" barrel MDR/MDRX rifles and allows both an M-LOK under handguard attachment as well as an integrated bipod to be used at the same time without interference.

In March 2022, ES Tactical, a Desert Tech Dealer who specializes in precision upgrade parts, began to sell after market caliber conversion kits in .350 Legend and .450 Bushmaster, resulting in the first bullpup to be chambered in those cartridges.

In January 2023, Desert tech announced multiple MDRx Rifle updates to resolve rifle weaknesses.  Desert Tech indicated that these updates would be incorporated in all post announcement MDRx shipments.  These updates include a new magazine transfer bar, magazine catch, updated non folding charging handle system (charging handle post, charging handle, and recoil buffer), a press-fit gas block, and barrel gas port inside bevel.

References 

Semi-automatic rifles of the United States
Bullpup rifles
Assault rifles of the United States
.300 BLK firearms
7.62×51mm NATO battle rifles
5.56×45mm NATO assault rifles
Weapons and ammunition introduced in 2014
Weapons and ammunition introduced in 2017
Weapons and ammunition introduced in 2018
Weapons and ammunition introduced in 2020
Trial and research firearms of the United States